The following is a list of events relating to television in Ireland from 1979.

Events
January – RTÉ establishes an internal working party to investigate the representation of women in news reporting. Their findings are published in April 1981.
8 April – UK children's television series Worzel Gummidge begins airing on RTÉ 1 two months after its screening debut in its original country.
May – The Riordans is aired on television for the final time. It switches to radio and continues until 1985.
4 June – The long-running children's television series Bosco begins an eight-part pilot series.
29 September – 1 October – Coverage of Pope John Paul II's visit to Ireland is broadcast on RTÉ radio and television.
2 October – Mary McAleese debuts as a reporter on the current affairs programme Frontline.
12 December – Albert Reynolds is appointed as Minister for Posts and Telegraphs.

Debuts

RTÉ 1
7 January –  Children of the New Forest (1977)
8 April –  Worzel Gummidge (1979–1981)
5 June –  Jana of the Jungle (1978)
2 October –  To the Manor Born (1979–1981, 2007)
9 November – The Live Mike (1979–1982)

RTÉ 2
4 June – Bosco (1979–1996)
8 July – The Sunday Game (1979–present)

Ongoing television programmes
RTÉ News: Nine O'Clock (1961–present)
RTÉ News: Six One (1962–present)
The Late Late Show (1962–present)
Quicksilver (1965–1981)
Wanderly Wagon (1967–1982)
Hall's Pictorial Weekly (1971–1980)
Sports Stadium (1973–1997)
Trom agus Éadrom (1975–1985)
The Late Late Toy Show (1975–present)
RTÉ News on Two (1978–2014)

Ending this year
May – The Riordans (1965–1979)

Births
20 March – Amy Huberman, actress and writer
16 August - Brian Ormond, singer and television presenter
9 October – Chris O'Dowd, comedian and actor
17 October – Leigh Arnold, actress
24 November – Kirsteen O'Sullivan, television presenter
Undated – Aisling O'Loughlin, journalist, newsreader and presenter

See also
1979 in Ireland

References

 
1970s in Irish television